Brahacharanam is a sub-sect of the Iyer community of Tamil Brahmins. The word "Brahacharanam" is a corruption of the Sanskrit word Brhatcharanam. Many Brahacharanam follow the Advaita Vedanta philosophy propounded by Adi Sankaracharya. However, some Brahacharanam are staunchly Saivite unlike followers of Adi Sankaracharya, or else adhere to "Sivadvaita" so to speak. The Brahacharanams, along with the Vadamas, form the major portion of the Kerala Iyer community.

Etymology 
The word bruhat in Sanskrit means "great", "vast" or "significant" and the word charanam refers to feet. The name Brahacharanam can be thus literally translated as "feet of the greats" referring to the status of a Guru, and the Brahacharanam being those who follow in the footsteps of the Greats.

Another interpretation for Brahacharanam provided by K.A Nilakanta Sastri in his 'History of South India' is the 'Great Migration'. Sastri notes that this could be taken as evidence of one of the earliest migrations of people from North India into South, especially given that many Brahacharanam sub-sects have names such as Satyamangalam, Mangudi etc. - all names of villages hugging Western Ghats, and thereby denoting the route taken from North to South. It is to be noted however that Sastri considers this interpretation to be too speculative, given there is no direct evidence for the same.

Origins 
Their exact origins are not clear but their presence in the Tamil Kingdoms extends back at least to the reign of Parantaka Chola II, who is said to have brahmarayars as ministers. Many of the agraharam villages of the Brahacharanam also have very ancient origins.

According to some, they made their way into the Tamil country through the Satyamangalam Pass.

Sub-groups 

The Brahacharanam are divided into the following subgroups:
 Kandiramanickam ( A village in Tiruvarur district,near Kodavasal,in Nachiyar kovil to Nannilam road)
 Milaganur ( A village in Sivagangai district)
 Mangudi ( Village in Tanjore district near Kumbakonam)
 Malanadu ( Village in Trichy)
 Pazhamaneri ( A village in Tanjore district)
 Musanadu
 Kolathur ( A village in Kanchipuram district)
 Marudancheri ( A village in Sivagangai district) 
 Rajagambiram ( A village in Sivagangai district near Manamadurai town )
 Ilanji ( a village in Tirunelveli district)
 Mazhavanattu
 Sathyamangalam (Erode district)
 Puduru Dravida (In Andhra Pradesh)

A significant number of Brahacharanams have migrated to Kerala, where they are part of the Kerala Iyer community. They have also migrated in large numbers to Puuru (meaning new town/village /place) in between nellore and Chennai, Andhra Pradesh where they form the Puduru Dravida community.

Culture 
Most Brahacharanam are worshippers of Shiva, and they cover their forehead with sacred ashes. Some used to wear Vibhuti in the Shape of the Sivalinga on their foreheads due their strong adherence to Lord Siva and no other. However, the Sathyamangalam group have some members who wear the vaishnava mark.

Women also dress like other Iyers. In the ancient times, the cloth worn by the women used to be of little more than a knee's length. Among the Milaganur Brahacharanam, the Adrishya Pondugal ceremony is celebrated in which four women, a widow and a bachelor are invited to a feast. This was done in order to propitiate four women who disappeared due to the ill treatment of their mothers in law.

It has been documented that some Bracharanam who lived in places like Mangudi were such rigid Saivites that they would not even utter Govinda's name and lived a life of stern austerity.

Traditional role 

The traditional function of Brahacharanams is to study and impart Vedic knowledge or officiate as priests in religious functions. However, there is evidence that in ancient times, they might have also served in the army or in civil and administrative services. During the Chola period, members of the community (especially the Pazhamaneri Brahacharanam) even served as army commanders. Senapathi Krishnan Raman was the Commander-in-chief of the Imperial Chola army of Rajendra Chola I. Brahacharanam also consider themselves to be among the first followers of Adi Shankaracharya.

Notable people 
Some notable Brahacharanams are:

Chandrasekhar family (Mangudi sub-group)

 Sir C.V.Raman, Nobel Prize winner in Physics from India
Subrahmanyan Chandrasekhar, Nobel Prize winner in Physics from India, nephew of C.V.Raman

Others 
 Maha Vaidyanatha Iyer, a Carnatic vocalist
 D. V. Gundappa, a writer, poet and philosopher<ref></ref
 Lalgudi G Jayaraman, legendary carnatic musician, and Violinist
 Actor Sri Jaishankar, legendary Tamil movie actor, and philanthropist
 Kunnakudi Vaidyanathan (Famous Violinist)
 Natesa Sastri ( Indian Polyglot)
 Subrahmanya Siva ( Freedom Fighter and tamil writer)
 P.S Sivaswamy Iyer ( Famous lawyer during British times )
 Mahakavi C Subramania Bharathi ( famous tamil writer)
 V Balakumaran (tamil writer and novelist) 
 V.S Ramachandran ( Indian neuroscientist)
 Justice T Paramasiva Iyer ( Sessions Judge of Bengaluru)
 Sir T Sadasiva Iyer ( Indian Judge)
 T.P Kailasam ( Kannada writer and son of Paramasiva Iyer )
 Sir Alladi Krishnaswamy Iyer (former member of constituent assembly of India )
 Alladi Ramakrishnan ( founder of Matscience India , son of Sir Alladi Krishnaswamy Iyer )
 Alladi Kuppusamy ( prominent jurist , son of Sir Alladi Krishnaswamy Iyer, brother of Alladi Ramakrishnan)
 M.R Jambunathan ( Vedic scholar who translated the four Vedas into tamil )
 Krishnan Raman Brahmarayar ( commander - in - chief of the chola army)

Notes 

Tamil Brahmins
Smarta tradition